Jeff Gilmour (born December 28, 1947) is a former American politician and member of the Oregon House of Representatives. He is a farmer.

References

1947 births
Living people
Democratic Party members of the Oregon House of Representatives
Politicians from Salem, Oregon
Farmers from Oregon
People from Marion County, Oregon